Frederick II, Count of Zollern (died: 1142 or after 1145) was the eldest son of Frederick I, Count of Zollern, and became Count of Zollern after his father's death around 1125.

Frederick II supported Lothar of Supplinburg, who was King of Germany, then Holy Roman Emperor, from 1125 to Lothar's death in 1137 against the House of Hohenstaufen, then supported that same house (and the new German King, Conrad III of Germany) after 1138 against the House of Welf.

It was also at this time that the counts of Zollern were able to greatly increase their possessions in terms of both territory and castles in the southwestern parts of today's Germany, expanding to the Rhine, and lower Danube, as well as adding territory in Alsace and by the Neckar.  All of these possessions were in the form of allodial land.  Land held in feudal tenure was added to these outright possessions to form the ancestral territory of the counts of Zollern.

Family and children 
Frederick had at least two sons:
 Frederick III, Count of Zollern,, who became Burgrave of Nuremberg as Friedrich I
 Bertold of Zollern

See also 
 House of Hohenzollern

References

External links 
 Page at Genealogie Mittelalter – Mittelalterliche Genealogie im Deutschen Reich bis zum Ende der Staufer

Year of birth unknown
Year of death unknown
12th-century deaths
12th-century German nobility
Counts of Zollern
House of Hohenzollern